Wilson Medical Center is a 294-bed hospital located in Wilson, North Carolina, serving Wilson and the surrounding counties. It was established in the 1960s and is the only hospital located in Wilson County. The hospital's chief executive is Mark Holyoak.

References 

Hospitals in North Carolina
Buildings and structures in Wilson County, North Carolina